Kingsey Falls, Quebec is a town in Centre-du-Québec, Quebec, Canada, with a population of 1,946 at the 2016 census. It is 30 km east of Drummondville and west of Route 116. One of the largest employers in the community is Cascades, which is headquartered there.

Demographics 

Population:
 Population in 2016: 1,947 (2011 to 2016 population change: -2.7%)
 Population in 2011: 2,000 
 Population in 2006: 2,086
 Population in 2001: 2,023
 Population in 1996: 1,868
 Population in 1906: 400
 Population in 1897: 400

See also
 Marie-Victorin Kirouac

References

(Google Maps)

External links

Cities and towns in Quebec
Incorporated places in Centre-du-Québec